The Eliel Square is a square on the west side of the Helsinki Central Station in the heart of Helsinki, Finland. It is named after the railway station designer Eliel Saarinen. The square is for the most part the departure and arrival platforms for regional buses.

At the northern end of the square is the Holiday Inn Hotel and at the southern end is the restaurant Vltava.

History
On the site of the square used to be a small railway yard, an express luggage wing, which served as a kind of wholesale arrangement area. After its demolition, the area was used as a parking space. The new town plan south of Töölönlahti was completed in 1996, and it also included the Eliel Square. The area then passed into city ownership in accordance with an agreement between the city and the country.

New Eliel
The New Eliel is a project launched in 2017, in which the square will be developed, among other things, through new construction. Construction can be a business, operational, service and cultural space, but it should take into account the historical nature of the area and preserve the Vltava building, which is more than a hundred years old. The upper limit of the building height is about 44 meters above sea level, i.e. the construction must not be higher than the Post Office. The area enables the creation of new jobs in the city center with good public transport connections. The project is also intended to develop the flow of pedestrian traffic around the railway station. The total construction target in the planning area was initially 40,000 square meters, but it has since been decided to reduce the volume target for the project by about a quarter.

An international architectural competition was held at the end of 2020 to develop Eliel and also the adjacent Railway Square, of which five proposals for the competition were announced in March 2021.

Gallery

References

External links

 New Eliel (in English)

Squares in Helsinki
Bus stations in Finland
Kluuvi